Fullerton Boys, commonly spelled Fullerton Boyz, is a group of gang members mostly composed of Korean-American delinquents that lived in the city of Fullerton, California. Most of its members belonged to the LVM Gang, SZA gang (Sarzana) gang and some from the Wah Ching gang. These gang members were known to also claim Fullerton Boyz against their rivals and as the gangs disbanded in Fullerton, most of them started to claim Fullerton Boyz as a gang.

History 
Fullerton Boyz was founded in 1996 by a group of Korean teens living in Fullerton, CA. Fullerton Boyz were not considering themselves as a gang but rather as a faction of two dominant Asian gangs in Fullerton, which were the LVM Gang and Sarzana street gangs. This fraction also composed of members of the Wah Ching gang that were living in Fullerton at the time. In the mid 1990s most of the LVM Gang, Sarzana, and Wah Ching gang members in Fullerton were arrested during an intense police investigation of crime sprees that involved assaults on rival gang members and home invasions. With the fallout of LVM and Sarzana, the former members started to claim Fullerton Boyz against their rivals. By the late 1990s, Fullerton Boyz membership started to grow and with it came criminal activities involving the group.

Activities 
Fullerton Boyz main rivals were the Garden Grove Boyz, the Korean Trouble Makerz and Asian street gangs. The rivalry often resulted in assaults and gang brawls in each of these cities. Whoever was claiming any of these three cities were often assaulted by the others. The early 1990s was the golden age for Fullerton Boys until they started dying out. In 1993, members of Koreatown Mobsters "tagged" a car of a Fullerton Boys' member during a festival in Koreatown. In retaliation, members of Fullerton Boys agreed to meet at a park with the rivals. This caused to be deadly. It left an innocent bystander with a bullet in the chest and many of the older members were arrested. This proved to be a turning point for Fullerton Boys. With the lack of leadership and membership, they went on a hiatus. Koreatown Mobsters and its allies, Crazyies, soon went on a homicide spree which injured nearly(?) three Fullerton Boys members in a two-month period and killed one, most of them being done by shootings. In the same year, another rival gang called the Family Mobsters open(ed) fire at a restaurant parking lot. Their target was a member of the Fullerton Boys. No one was injured, but this caused another war for the Fullerton Boys. Family Mobsters and Garden Grove Boys teamed up to target Fullerton Boys.  In 1994, members of the LVM Gang were arrested in a home invasion and in September, 2000, members of the Triad Boyz and the Fullerton Boyz were involved in a deadly shootout which left several injured and one dead from gunshot wounds. In the early 1990s, members of Wah Ching who were involved with Fullerton Boys were also shot by their main rivals, the Hankook Boyz.

Membership 
Over the years Fullerton Boys slowly died out; as of 2016, Fullerton Boys has become active again in the Orange  thorpe area.

See also
 Gangs in the United States

References 
 
 

Gangs in the United States
Asian-American gangs
Organizations based in Fullerton, California
Korean-American culture in California
1996 establishments in California